Michael Shelley is a New York City–based singer-songwriter. He has released 5 albums. He has opened tours in the United States for They Might Be Giants, Shonen Knife & Marshall Crenshaw, in Japan. Some members of Belle & Sebastian have played on his records & with him live on UK tours. Michael Shelley is also a disc jockey at freeform radio station WFMU, known for his weekly interviews with musicians.

Discography
Jimmy's Corner (May 15, 2015 – Confidential Recordings) a 30 song album of instrumental songs 
Leftovers (2012 – Confidential Recordings) a collection of live tracks, non-lp cuts, cover songs and various rarities.
Goodbye Cheater (2005 – Confidential Recordings)(Confidential was co-founded by Shelley in 2001)
I Blame You (2001 – Bar None)
Too Many Movies (1998 – Big Deal) (released in UK on Shoeshine Records, 2001)
Half Empty (1997 – Big Deal)
Four Arms To Hold You (1998 – Big Deal) a collaborative effort with Scottish musician Francis MacDonald (BMX Bandits, Teenage Fanclub, etc.) under the band name "Cheeky Monkey".

Also Appears on 
 He's A Rebel: The Gene Pitney Story Retold (2002 – To M'Lou Music) performing "Walk"
 What the World Needs Now ... Big Deal Artists Perform The Songs of Burt Bacharach (1998 – Big Deal) performing "Baby It's You"

References

External links 
Official Website
Current Record Label
Radio Station WFMU
[ All Music Guide]

Living people
American radio DJs
Year of birth missing (living people)
Singer-songwriters from New York (state)